Peripatopsis tulbaghensis is a species of velvet worm in the family Peripatopsidae. This species is dark brown with 17 pairs of legs and ranges from 8 mm to 32 mm in length. Also known as the Tulbagh velvet worm, this species is found in Groot Winterhoek mountain region in South Africa.

References 

Animals described in 2020
Endemic fauna of South Africa
Onychophorans of temperate Africa
Onychophoran species